Bargteheide-Land is an Amt ("collective municipality") in the district of Stormarn, in Schleswig-Holstein, Germany. It is situated around Bargteheide, which is the seat of the Amt, but not part of it.

The Amt Bargteheide-Land consists of the following municipalities:

Bargfeld-Stegen 
Delingsdorf 
Elmenhorst 
Hammoor 
Jersbek 
Nienwohld 
Todendorf 
Tremsbüttel

References

Ämter in Schleswig-Holstein